Uhowo  is a village in the administrative district of Gmina Łapy, within Białystok County, Podlaskie Voivodeship, in north-eastern Poland. Uhowo lies on the Narew River.

The village has a population of 1,500.

References

Villages in Białystok County